Kazakhstan was the host nation of the 2011 Asian Winter Games in Almaty and Astana from January 30, 2011 to February 6, 2011. Kazakhstan hosted the games for the first time.

Alpine skiing

Men

Women

Bandy

Kazakhstan won gold in bandy.

Squad

Preliminaries
All times are Almaty Time (UTC+06:00)

Final

Biathlon

Kazakhstan will send a team of 21 athletes. The team includes Olympic silver medalist Elena Khrustaleva.
Men
Alexsandr Chervyhkov
Yan Savitskiy
Alexandr Trifonov
Dias Keneshev
Nikolay Braichenko
Sergey Naumik

Women
Viktoriya Afanasyeva
Elena Khrustaleva
Anna Lebedeva
Irina Mozhevitina
Galina Okolzdayeva
Marina Lebedeva
Olga Poltoranina

Cross country skiing

Kazakhstan will send a team of 20 athletes.
Men
Alexey Poltaranin
Nikolay Chebotko
Sergey Cherepanov
Yevgeniy Velichko
Eugene Koshevoi
Gennady Matviyenko
Yerdos Akhmadiyev
Mark Starostin
Denis Volotko
Andrey Golovko

Women
Svetlana Malahova-Shishkina
Elena Kolomina
Tatjana Roshina
Oxana Jatskaja
Marina Matrossova
Anastasiya Slonova
Yelena Sakhnova
Yekaterina Semenovikh
Yelena Antonova
Tatyana Shchedenko

Freestyle skiing

Kazakhstan will send a team of 12 athletes.
Men
Dmitry Reiherd - Moguls
Dmitriy Barmashov - Moguls
Andrey Sokolov - Moguls
Ruslan Ablyatifov - Aerials
Yuriy Khokhlov - Aerials
Sergey Berestovskiy - Aerials

Women
Darya Rybalova - Moguls
Yulia Galysheva - Moguls
Yuliya Rodionova - Moguls
Gul'mira Dal'mukhan - Aerials
Zhibek Arapbayeva - Aerials
Akmarzhan Kalmurzaeva - Aerials

Figure skating

Kazakhstan will send a team of 8 figure skaters. 
Men

Women

Pairs

Ice dance

Ice hockey

Men
The men's team is in the top division for these games.
Roster
Vitaliy Yeremeyev
Vitaly Kolesnik
Alexei Kuznetsov
Roman Savchenko
Alexei Vassilchenko
Yevgeny Fadeev
Vitaly Novopashin
Alexei Litvinenko
Maxim Semenov
Alexei Koledayev
Evgeny Blokhin
Evgeni Bumagin
Andrei Gavrilin
Vadim Krasnoslobodtsev
Evgeny Rymarev
Roman Starchenko
Talgat Zhailauov
Fedor Polischuk
Maxim Khudyakov
Maksim Belyayev
Dmitry Upper
Dmitri Dudarev
Ivan Poloshkov

Group A 

All times are local (UTC+6).

Women
Roster
Ayzhan Raushanova
Dar'ya Obydennova
Anna Kosenko
Natal'ya Trunova
Viktoriya Sazonova
Galina Shu
Ol'ga Konysheva
Yelena Shtel'mayster
Viktoriya Musataeva
Al'bina Suprun
Anastasiya Orlova
Natal'ya Yakovchuk
Larisa Sviridova
Alena Fuks
Lyubov Ibragimova
Zarina Tukhtieva
Ol'ga Potapova
Ol'ga Kryukova
Aleksandra Ashikhina
Mariya Topkaeva
Galiya Nurgalieva
Tat'yana Koroleva

Group A 

All times are local (UTC+6).

Ski jumping

Kazakhstan will send a team of 5 athletes.
Men
Nikolay Karpenko
Alex Korolev
Evgeni Levkin
Radik Zhaparov
Konstantin Sokolenko

Ski orienteering

Kazakhstan will send a team of 12 athletes.
Men
Aleksandr Babenko
Aleksey Nemtsev
Vitaliy Lilichenko
Mikhail Sorokin
Denis Vlasov
Aslan Tokbaev

Women
Yevgeniya Kuzmina
Tat'yana Mikhaylova
Ol'ga Novikova
Elmira Moldasheva
Mariya Vlasova
Meruert Imasheva

Speed skating

Kazakhstan will send a team of 18 speed skaters.
Men
Dmitry Babenko
Denis Kuzin
Aleksandr Zhigin
Artem Belousov
Romman Krech
Aleksey Bondarchuk
Viktor Glushenko
Aleksandr Glushchenko
Maksim Baklashkin

Women
Yekaterina Aydova
Tat'yana Sokirko
Ol'ga Zhigana
Viktoriya Lugovaya
Yuliya Gonchar
Irina Shumikhina
Yelena Urvantseva
Yevgeniya Safina
Natal'ya Rybakova

Short track speed skating

Kazakhstan will send a full team of 10 athletes.
Men
Aidar Bekzhanov
Artur Sultangaliev
Nurbergen Zhumagaziev
Abzal Azhgaliev
Fedor Andreev

Women
Inna Simonova
Kseniya Motova
Dar'ya Volokitina
Anna Samarina
Anastasiya Kuznetsova

See also
Kazakhstan at the 2010 Winter Olympics

References

Nations at the 2011 Asian Winter Games
Asian Winter Games
Kazakhstan at the Asian Winter Games